Chelsea on the Rocks is a documentary film directed by Abel Ferrara about the Hotel Chelsea. It premiered out of competition at the 2008 Cannes Film Festival. The film features Ferrara interviewing people who have and had lived at the hotel, intercut with dramatized footage of some famous events that took place there. During the film's interviews and docudrama Gaby Hoffmann, Dennis Hopper, Robert Crumb, Adam Goldberg and Bijou Phillips make appearances.

The film premiered at the 2008 Cannes Film Festival out of competition, and opened in theatres on October 2, 2009.

Reception 
On review aggregator Rotten Tomatoes, the film holds an approval rating of 71% based on 28 reviews, with an average rating of 6.92/10. The website's critical consensus reads, "Abel Ferrara's loving portrait of New York's Chelsea Hotel is less interested in telling the story of its famous residents than in exploring the magic of the place that housed so many moments in rock history."

References

External links

2008 documentary films
Films directed by Abel Ferrara
Films set in hotels
American documentary films
Culture of Manhattan
Documentary films about New York City
2008 films
Films set in Manhattan
Chelsea, Manhattan
2000s English-language films
2000s American films